Edward Cooper was an English professional footballer who played in the Football League for Glossop, Newcastle United and Notts County as an outside right.

Personal life 
Cooper served as a corporal in the West Yorkshire Regiment and the Royal Engineers during the First World War.

Career statistics

References 

1891 births
English footballers
Newcastle United F.C. players
British Army personnel of World War I

Year of death missing
Sportspeople from Walsall
Association football outside forwards
Stafford Rangers F.C. players
Glossop North End A.F.C. players
Notts County F.C. players
West Yorkshire Regiment soldiers
Royal Engineers soldiers